The 1993 Vuelta a España was the 48th edition of the Vuelta a España, one of cycling's Grand Tours. The Vuelta began in A Coruña, with an individual time trial on 26 April, and Stage 11 occurred on 6 May with a stage to Cerler. The race finished in Santiago de Compostela on 16 May.

Stage 1
26 April 1993 — A Coruña to A Coruña,  (ITT)

Stage 2
27 April 1993 — A Coruña to Vigo,

Stage 3
28 April 1993 — Vigo to Ourense,

Stage 4
29 April 1993 — A Gudiña to Salamanca,

Stage 5
30 April 1993 — Salamanca to Ávila,

Stage 6
1 May 1993 — Palazuelos de Eresma (Destilerías DYC) to Navacerrada,  (ITT)

Stage 7
2 May 1993 — Palazuelos de Eresma (Destilerías DYC) to Madrid,

Stage 8
3 May 1993 — Aranjuez to Albacete,

Stage 9
4 May 1993 — Albacete to Valencia,

Stage 10
5 May 1993 — Valencia to La Sénia,

Stage 11
6 May 1993 — Lleida to Cerler,

References

01
1993,01